Philosepedon is a genus of flies belonging to the family Psychodidae.

Distribution
The species of this genus are found in Europe, Asia and America.

Species
Philosepedon africanus Wagner, 1979
Philosepedon aliciae Ibáñez-Bernal, 2005
Philosepedon apozonallii Stebner & Solórzano-Kraemer, 2014
Philosepedon arabicum Ježek & Harten, 2002
Philosepedon atopos Quate, 1996
Philosepedon atschitaricus Vaillant & Joost, 1983
Philosepedon austriacus Vaillant, 1974
Philosepedon balinsasayae Quate, 1965
Philosepedon balkanicus Krek, 1970
Philosepedon beaucornui Vaillant, 1974
Philosepedon bicalcaratus Quate, 1996
Philosepedon calabens Quate, 1965
Philosepedon carpaticus Vaillant, 1974
Philosepedon clouensis Ježek, 1994
Philosepedon deceptrix Quate, 1996
Philosepedon decipiens Quate, 1965
Philosepedon dimorphus Quate, 1996
Philosepedon duacopis Quate, 1999
Philosepedon dumosum Omelková & Ježek, 2012
Philosepedon ensiger Quate, 1996
Philosepedon forcipata Quate & Quate, 1967
Philosepedon fratruelis Quate, 1962
Philosepedon frontalis Quate, 1965
Philosepedon hrudkai Ježek, 1999
Philosepedon humeralis (Meigen, 1818)
Philosepedon ibericus Vaillant, 1974
Philosepedon kalehnus Vaillant, 1974
Philosepedon katangladensis Quate, 1965
Philosepedon kowarzi Ježek, 1995
Philosepedon labecula Quate, 1963
Philosepedon longistylus Quate, 1996
Philosepedon majorinus Quate, 1996
Philosepedon mauroae Wagner & Masteller, 1996
Philosepedon memnonius Quate, 1966
Philosepedon mexicana Quate, 1963
Philosepedon monstruosus Ježek & Mogi, 1995
Philosepedon mutabilis Quate, 1965
Philosepedon neretvanicus Krek, 1976
Philosepedon nickerli Ježek, 1995
Philosepedon nocturnalis Quate, 1965
Philosepedon occidentalis Krek, 1976
Philosepedon operosa Quate, 1962
Philosepedon orientale Krek, 1977
Philosepedon orientalis Wagner, 1981
Philosepedon parciproma Quate, 1962
Philosepedon parifurcus Quate, 1996
Philosepedon pectinata Quate & Quate, 1967
Philosepedon perdecorum Omelková & Ježek, 2012
Philosepedon pragensis Ježek, 1995
Philosepedon primoryanus Wagner, 1994
Philosepedon provincialis Vaillant, 1974
Philosepedon pudica Quate, 1962
Philosepedon pyrenaicus Vaillant, 1974
Philosepedon quadricuspis Quate & Quate, 1967
Philosepedon quatei Vaillant, 1973
Philosepedon sakhalinus Wagner, 1994
Philosepedon sandalioticus Salamanna, 1982
Philosepedon scutigerus Vaillant, 1963
Philosepedon sessilis Quate & Quate, 1967
Philosepedon setosa Quate & Quate, 1967
Philosepedon soljani Krek, 1971
Philosepedon symmetricus Wagner, 1986
Philosepedon tetartos Quate, 1996
Philosepedon torosa Quate & Quate, 1967
Philosepedon tripetalis Quate, 1996
Philosepedon tritaxis Quate, 1996
Philosepedon tritenaculus Quate, 1996
Philosepedon triungulata Eaton, 1913
Philosepedon wagneri Omelková & Ježek, 2012

References

Nematocera genera
Diptera of Asia
Diptera of Europe
Diptera of South America
Diptera of North America
Diptera of Africa
Psychodidae
Taxa named by Alfred Edwin Eaton